Maury may refer to:

Places

United States
 Maury Mountains, Oregon
 Maury County, Tennessee
 Maury River, Virginia, a tributary of the James River

 Maury Island, a small island near Seattle, Washington

France
 Maury, Pyrénées-Orientales, a town and commune
 Lac de Maury, a lake in Aveyron

Antarctica
 Maury Bay, Wilkes Land
 Maury Glacier, Palmer Land

Canada
 Maury Channel, Nunavut

Outer space
 Maury (crater), a small crater on the Moon
 3780 Maury, an asteroid

Pacific Ocean storms
 Tropical Storm Maury (1981)
 Tropical Storm Maury (1984)
 Tropical Storm Maury (1987)

Other uses
 Maury (name), a list of people with the given name or surname
 Maury (talk show), hosted by Maury Povich
 Maury AOC, an appellation for wines made in the Roussillon wine region of France
 USS Maury, various ships
 Maury, nickname for RMS Mauretania, early-1900s ocean liner

See also
 Maury City, Tennessee, a town
 Mauries, a commune in France
 Mory (disambiguation)
 Murry (disambiguation)
 Mury (disambiguation)
 Morley (disambiguation)